SGEM may refer to:

Speak Good English Movement, a Singapore Government campaign
Spy Games: Elevator Mission, a first person shooter by Dreams Co. Ltd.